Gerald Bard Tjoflat (born December 6, 1929) is an American lawyer and Senior United States circuit judge of the United States Court of Appeals for the Eleventh Circuit.

Education and career
Tjoflat was born in Pittsburgh, Pennsylvania. He served in the United States Army from 1953 to 1955, attaining the rank of corporal. Tjoflat earned his Bachelor of Laws from Duke University School of Law in 1957. He was in private practice in Jacksonville, Florida from 1957 to 1968 and served as a judge of the Fourth Judicial Circuit of Florida in Jacksonville from 1968 to 1970.

Federal judicial service
President Richard Nixon nominated Tjoflat to the United States District Court for the Middle District of Florida on October 7, 1970, to a new seat created by 84 Stat. 294. He was confirmed by the United States Senate on October 13, 1970, he received his commission three days later. His service terminated on December 12, 1975, due to his elevation to the Fifth Circuit.

President Gerald Ford nominated Tjoflat to the United States Court of Appeals for the Fifth Circuit on November 3, 1975, to a seat vacated by Judge John Milton Bryan Simpson. He was confirmed by the Senate on November 20, 1975, he received his commission the next day and began serving on the court on December 12, 1975. Tjoflat was reassigned by operation of law to the United States Court of Appeals for the Eleventh Circuit on October 1, 1981, when that court was established. He served as Chief Judge from 1989 to 1996.

Following the failure of the Robert Bork nomination in 1987, Tjoflat was placed on the short list of possible nominees for the Supreme Court seat formerly occupied by Lewis F. Powell Jr.. Former Governor Claude R. Kirk Jr. pushed for Tjoflat to be nominated after Douglas H. Ginsburg withdrew, but although Florida Senators Lawton Chiles and Bob Graham both said Tjoflat was much more acceptable than Bork, it was always extremely uncertain whether Northeastern Democrats would have found him acceptable, and consequently the seat went to Anthony Kennedy.

Retirement
During the second week of August 2019, Tjoflat informed President Donald Trump that he will take senior status contingent upon the confirmation and appointment of his successor. He was the last federal judge in active service to have been appointed to his position by President Ford, and as of 2023 remains the fourth-longest-serving federal judge measured by time in active service. On November 19, 2019, his successor, Robert J. Luck, was confirmed and received his commission the same day. After his successor received his commission, he assumed senior status on the same day.

Memberships and honor
In 1995, the Duke Law Journal at the Duke University School of Law published a tribute to Tjoflat that included articles by then-Chief Justice William H. Rehnquist, retired Justices Lewis F. Powell, Jr. and Byron R. White, and Judge Edward R. Becker of the U.S. Court of Appeals for the Third Circuit, among others.

See also
List of United States federal judges by longevity of service

Notes

References

Sources
 

1929 births
Living people
20th-century American judges
21st-century American judges
Duke University School of Law alumni
Judges of the United States Court of Appeals for the Eleventh Circuit
Judges of the United States Court of Appeals for the Fifth Circuit
Judges of the United States District Court for the Middle District of Florida
Lawyers from Pittsburgh
Florida state court judges
United States court of appeals judges appointed by Gerald Ford
United States district court judges appointed by Richard Nixon